Typhochrestus is a genus of sheet weavers that was first described by Eugène Louis Simon in 1884.

Species
 it contains thirty-seven species:
Typhochrestus acoreensis Wunderlich, 1992 – Azores
Typhochrestus alticola Denis, 1953 – France
Typhochrestus berniae Bosmans, 2008 – Spain
Typhochrestus bifurcatus Simon, 1884 – Spain, Algeria
Typhochrestus bogarti Bosmans, 1990 – Portugal, Spain, France, Morocco
Typhochrestus brucei Tullgren, 1955 – Sweden
Typhochrestus chiosensis Wunderlich, 1995 – Greece, Turkey
Typhochrestus ciliiunti Barrientos & Febrer, 2018 – Spain (Menorca)
Typhochrestus curvicervix (Denis, 1964) – Tunisia
Typhochrestus cyrenanius Denis, 1964 – Libya
Typhochrestus digitatus (O. Pickard-Cambridge, 1873) (type) – Europe, North Africa
Typhochrestus djellalensis Bosmans & Bouragba, 1992 – Algeria
Typhochrestus dubius Denis, 1950 – France
Typhochrestus epidaurensis Wunderlich, 1995 – Greece
Typhochrestus fortunatus Thaler, 1984 – Canary Is.
Typhochrestus hesperius Thaler, 1984 – Canary Is.
Typhochrestus ikarianus Tanasevitch, 2011 – Greece
Typhochrestus inflatus Thaler, 1980 – Switzerland, Austria, Italy, Caucasus
Typhochrestus longisulcus Gnelitsa, 2006 – Ukraine
Typhochrestus madeirensis Crespo, 2013 – Madeira
Typhochrestus mauretanicus Bosmans, 1990 – Morocco, Algeria
Typhochrestus meron Tanasevitch, 2013 – Israel
Typhochrestus montanus Wunderlich, 1987 – Canary Is.
Typhochrestus numidicus Bosmans, 1990 – Algeria
Typhochrestus paradorensis Wunderlich, 1987 – Canary Is.
Typhochrestus pekkai Bosmans & Oger, 2014 – France (Corsica)
Typhochrestus penevi Komnenov, 2014 – Macedonia
Typhochrestus pygmaeus (Sørensen, 1898) – Canada, Greenland
Typhochrestus sardus Bosmans, 2008 – Sardinia
Typhochrestus simoni Lessert, 1907 – Europe
Typhochrestus sireti Bosmans, 2008 – Spain
Typhochrestus spatulatus Bosmans, 1990 – Morocco, Algeria
Typhochrestus splendidus Bosmans, 1990 – Algeria
Typhochrestus sylviae Hauge, 1968 – Norway
Typhochrestus uintanus (Chamberlin & Ivie, 1939) – USA
Typhochrestus ultimus Bosmans, 1990 – Algeria
Typhochrestus virilis Bosmans, 1990 – Algeria

See also
 List of Linyphiidae species (Q–Z)

References

Araneomorphae genera
Linyphiidae
Spiders of Africa
Spiders of Asia
Spiders of North America